Isaac Charles Gilbert (7 Jan 1822 – 4 March 1885) was an English architect based in Nottingham.

Career
He was born in Kingston upon Hull in 1822, the son of Joseph Gilbert (1779–1852) a Congregational minister and his wife Ann (Taylor) (1782–1866) and baptised in Fish Street Independent Chapel, Kingston upon Hull on 22 January 1822.

He married Annie Gee (1829–1908) in St Nicholas' Church, Nottingham on 7 January 1851. They had the following children:
Annie Laurie Gilbert (1851–1943)
Jane Taylor Gilbert (1855–1937)
Alice May Gilbert (1862–1932)
Madeline Gilbert (1863–1946
Charles Humphrey Gilbert (1865–1951)
Isabel Gilbert (1867–1954)

He was architect of a number of Congregational chapels in various parts of the country.

He died on 4 March 1885 at Arthur Street, Nottingham and left an estate valued at £1,565.

Notable works

References

1822 births
1885 deaths
Architects from Nottingham
Architects from Kingston upon Hull